is a railway station of JR Kyushu Nippō Main Line in Miyakonojō, Miyazaki, Japan.

Railway stations in Miyazaki Prefecture
Railway stations in Japan opened in 1923